The 2004 European Speedway Club Champions' Cup.

Group A

Final

See also

2004
European C